The Holmesdale Fanatics is the name given to an organised supporters' group and ultras group associated with English  club Crystal Palace. The group are responsible for vocal support as well as flag and tifo displays. 

The group was founded in December 2005 by an originally small group of fans who had been going to games together since childhood in the 1980s and had stood in Block B in the Holmesdale Road Stand since 1999. They formed the group having experienced the "old school days of terracing" and wished to continue the traditions. Since its foundation, the group has continued to grow and is based in the Holmesdale Road Stand. In 2019, the group moved into Block E,  however, the move didn't come easy as the group found themselves on strike due to lack of action from the club around the proposed move. 

The group spent its early years fighting against "archaic" stadium rules brought in by the Taylor report, rules that were described by the group as being "repressive". In the late 2000s, the club fell into administration. The Fanatics as a group's role then rocketed as they began organising protests that saw the fanbase on a global stage. The club was eventually saved from administration in 2010.

England as a footballing nation does not have a so-called "ultra culture" unlike most of Europe and because of this, the Fanatics stand out as being arguably the country's most well-known ultra group.

External links
Official website
Official Twitter

References

Crystal Palace F.C.
Ultras groups